1972 is the fourth album by indie folk musician Josh Rouse. It was released on Rykodisc on August 26, 2003.

Track listing

References

2003 albums
Josh Rouse albums
Rykodisc albums
Albums produced by Brad Jones (musician)